Premat or Prémat is a surname. Notable people with the surname include:

 Alexandre Prémat (born 1982), French racing car driver
 Martial Premat (born 1977), French ski mountaineer